Brazeau Canyon Wildland Provincial Park is a wildland provincial park in Yellowhead County, central Alberta, Canada. The south end of the park adjoins Jasper National Park where the river exits the national park. A separate section of the park is a  area encompassing Muskiki Lake and is a few kilometers north of the main section of the park.

Ecology
Brazeau Canyon is in the foothills on the eastern slopes of the Rocky Mountains. It contains alpine and sub-alpine ecosystems. The park protects the valley and adjacent uplands and includes the former Muskiki Lake Natural Area and the western part of Marshybank Ecological Reserve. It specifically protects the "bed and shore" of the Brazeau River. There are mineral springs that contain sodium, calcium, potassium, magnesium, and other trace elements. The springs are used as mineral licks by elk, deer, and moose as well as providing mineral-rich soils for a variety of plants.

Activities
Backcountry camping and hiking are permitted within the park; there are no developed campsites. The park is focused on protecting the river; however, canoeing and kayaking are permitted. Hunting and fishing are allowed with authorization. Although there are no developed trails, old roads and seismic lines are used for hiking and horseback riding.

See also
List of Alberta provincial parks
List of Canadian provincial parks
Ecology of the Rocky Mountains

References

External links
 

Parks in Alberta
Mountain ranges of Alberta